Garvey Grain elevator is a 22-acre grain storage facility located just south of Hastings, Nebraska. Garvey constructed, owned and operated a more than 8-million bushel grain storage facility on its property from 1959 until 1998. In 1998, Ag Processing Inc. took over operations. From 1959 to 1985, a grain fumigant consisting primarily of carbon tetrachloride, a volatile organic compound which is a significant hepatotoxin (substance toxic to the liver), was used which contaminated the soil and groundwater. It was proposed as a Superfund site on April 27, 2005, and it was listed by the United States Environmental Protection Agency on September 14, 2005.

Superfund site
Garvey began cleanup in October 2005 but filed for Chapter 7 bankruptcy in March 2007.

The contamination created a plume of contaminated water approximately four miles long. In September 2016, the Environmental Protection Agency completed a remedial design for the groundwater recovery, treatment and discharge system.  However, the system still has not been constructed due to lack of government funding.

See also
List of Superfund sites in Nebraska

References

External links
Agency for Toxic Substances and Disease Registry Public Health Assessment
Grainnet announcement of Superfund status

Superfund sites in Nebraska